Bozhidar Ivanov (born 15 July 1943) is a Bulgarian gymnast. He competed in eight events at the 1968 Summer Olympics.

References

External links
 

1943 births
Living people
Bulgarian male artistic gymnasts
Olympic gymnasts of Bulgaria
Gymnasts at the 1968 Summer Olympics
Sportspeople from Ruse, Bulgaria